Liz Boldon is a Minnesota politician serving as a member of the Minnesota Senate. A member of the Democratic Farmer-Labor Party, she represents District 25, which includes much of Rochester and Olmsted County, Minnesota.

Early life and education 
Boldon was born in Waterloo, Iowa. She earned a Bachelor of Science in Nursing from Allen College and a Master of Science in nursing education from the University of Phoenix.

Career 
Since 2002, Boldon has worked as a nurse at the Mayo Clinic.

Boldon was one of 200 activists who were arrested in November 2021 in Washington, D.C., for blocking a sidewalk near the White House at a protest in support of the John Lewis Voting Rights Advancement Act and Freedom to Vote Act, two voting-right bills. The demonstration was organized by the League of Women Voters, People For the American Way, and Declaration for American Democracy. Boldon was issued a $50 citation, which she paid.

Minnesota House of Representatives 
Boldon served in the Minnesota House of Representatives between 2021 and 2023, succeeding Duane Sauke.

Minnesota Senate 
Boldon succeeded retiring State Senator Dave Senjem in the 2022 election, defeating Republican Ken Navitsky 59%-39%. She is currently serving as Assistant Majority Leader in the 93rd Minnesota Legislature.

References 

American nurses
University of Phoenix alumni
Democratic Party members of the Minnesota House of Representatives
Women state legislators in Minnesota
Year of birth missing (living people)
Living people
People from Waterloo, Iowa
21st-century American women